This is a list of submarines of the Netherlands navy.

Submarines built before 1940
Until the O 19 class there was distinction made between O submarines used for European home waters and K submarines used for colonial service.

Submarines built for service in Europe
O1-class submarine
 

 
 
 
 
O 6-class submarine
 
O 7-class submarine
 
German Type UC I submarine
 M1

 O 8

 
 
 

 
 
 
 
O 16-class submarine

Submarines built for colonial service
K I-class submarine
 K I
K II-class submarine
 K II

 K III
 K IV

 K V
 K VI
 K VII

 
 K IX
 

 K XI
 K XII
 K XIII

 K XIV
 K XV
 K XVI
 K XVII
 K XVIII

Submarines built for both colonial service and service in Europe

Submarines built after 1940

 Dolfijn

 Zeehond
 (Zwaardvisch-class submarine)
 Zwaardvisch
 Tijgerhaai
 Dolfijn
 Zeehond
 (Walrus-class submarine)
 Walrus
 Zeeleeuw
 and Potvis-class submarine

References

See also
 Royal Netherlands Navy Submarine Service
 Royal Netherlands Navy
 List of submarines of the Second World War

Netherlands